The Helicycle is a single-seat, semi-rigid two-bladed main rotor, helicopter powered by a Solar T62-32 engine. Manufactured by Helicycle Ventures LLC in Mesilla, New Mexico as a kit, the aircraft is intended to be assembled by the owner and is considered a homebuilt aircraft. The Helicycle was conceived and designed by B.J. Schramm, the founder of RotorWay International.

Development
Schramm's concept for the Helicycle was to provide a kit for building a reliable, high-performance, real helicopter for a reasonable cost to individuals (on the order of a mid-priced SUV). Fabrication and assembly skills only require being able to accurately drill holes, bend sheet metal and tubing, install fasteners, run wiring, etc.; no welding or highly specialized aviation-specific tools are required. Kits are delivered in six increments, including the frame and skids, engine, transmission, main rotor subassembly, tail rotor subassembly, controls and linkages, cockpit exterior/interior, and fuel and electrical subsystems. Assembly instructions are provided in the form of video clips on video CDs (Video CDs) or DVDs, blueprints, and checklists.

Design
Specific design features include a fully harmonized rotor, a modulated collective pitch system, very low twice-per-revolution vibration level due to elastomeric thrust bearings, a sufficient flapping angle for low-"G" maneuvers and slope landings, control friction devices, and an electronic throttle control (governor).

The feel of the controls in the Helicycle is modeled after that of the Robinson R22, such that quick stops and autorotations are performed similarly in both aircraft, reportedly allowing new pilots to transition to flying their kits with minimal adjustments.

Operational history
The Helicycle helicopter is the first experimental helicopter kit in mass-production to be powered by a turbine engine, the military surplus Solar T62-T32, capable of producing 150 shaft horsepower. The engine is limited to 95 horsepower due to torque limits on the main gearbox and rotor system.

As of June 2010, five runs of about 30 kits each had been delivered to builders, for a total of 160 kits, of which more than 80 had been completed and were flying, with another kit being completed every other month, on average (delivery of a sixth run was scheduled to start in 2010). A unique feature of the kits is that a factory checkout must be completed by a factory-designated airframe and power plant (A&P) technician and test pilot before the builder is allowed to fly the aircraft. The factory withholds a few critical components needed for flight, such as the main rotor bearings, which the factory representative brings to the checkout. In order to ensure that prospective pilots have the necessary flight skills, builders must have at least a solo endorsement from a certified flight instructor (CFI) for flying a commercially-built Robinson R22 helicopter.

The total number of hours accumulated on all Helicycles flying is estimated to be well in excess of 3,000 flight hours, with three fatal accidents, the latest occurring on 28 September 2014 in rural Sumner county, Tennessee.

The NTSB report on the fatal accident indicates extensive damage to the helicopter due to impact with a body of water. An examination of the anti-torque pedal assembly by the NTSB Materials Laboratory revealed that the fracture surface patterns found on it were consistent with a bending overstress separation. It could not be determined whether the overstress condition was the result of a precrash or postcrash event. According to the probable cause report, N3275Q suffered "inflight collision with terrain/water", and "reason for occurrence undetermined - Pilot In Command".

There have been several accidents and incidents where Helicycles have lost power in/near hover, resulting in minor damage to the skids and some airframes, but no serious injuries. Most of these were attributed to a radio-frequency interference (RFI) problem with the electronic governor, and the issue was reportedly solved with better shielding in 2005. At least one accident may have been caused by a crack in a fuel line due to lack of mechanical support between a manifold and a fuel injection port. Another accident involved flight into high-voltage power distribution wires, but the aircraft was able to fly again, following repairs, and the pilot was not seriously injured.

Specifications (Helicycle)

See also

Special Airworthiness Certificate
RotorWay International

References

EAA Chapter 25 July 2004 newsletter article describing Ami Sela's Helicycle construction project
NTSB accident investigation probable cause finding (.pdf)
Helicycle N3275Q NTSB accident investigation probable cause finding
Helicycle N3275Q NTSB accident investigation factual report
SW Aviator Magazine article on the Helicycle
February 2007 "Experimental Helo" magazine on-line article "What Kind of Person Builds a Helicopter?"
September 2004 "Kitplanes" magazine article "B.J. Schramm - A Homebuilding Legend"
 December 2003 "Kitplanes" magazine article (p. 7) "First Solar T-62 Turbines Available for Helicycle"
September 2003 "The Great Northwest Sport Rotorcraft Association" newsletter observations of the turbine-powered Helicycle, and discussions with factory-designated checkout technician and test pilot Doug Schwochert
February 2003 "Kitplanes" magazine article (p. 15) "It's Turbine Time for the Helicycle"
January 2002 "Kitplanes" magazine article (p. 81) "Miracle Machine? B.J. Schramm's Helicycle may rewrite the standards on homebuilt helis"
2001 EAA Arlington Fly-In Judging Results - Helicycle N3275Q voted Grand Champion Rotorcraft
February 2000 "Kitplanes" magazine news item (p. 4) "Around the Patch: What's up with the Helicycle?"
October 1997 "Experimental Aircraft Association Sport Aviation" magazine (p. 46) B.J. Schramm's Helicycle Motorcycle of the Air
October 1997 "Kitplanes" magazine news item (p. 88) "The Business Side: A new compound helicopter flies in Idaho (Helicycle)"
October 1995 "Kitplanes" magazine news item (p. 4) "Around the Patch: Helicycle, new kit from B. J. Schramm"
"Kitplanes" magazine 2007 Aircraft Directory
"Kitplanes" magazine 2006 Light-Sport Aircraft and Rotorcraft Directory 
"Kitplanes" magazine 2005 Trikes, 'Chutes and Rotorcraft Directory

External links
Helicycle Ventures LLC factory site
Experimental Aircraft Association page about Tom Sled's Helicycle N3722T — completed during the centennial year of the celebration of the Wright brothers' first flight. Sled's first Helicycle flight occurred within five minutes of the 100th anniversary of the Wright's first flight on 17 December 1903.

1990s United States civil utility aircraft
1990s United States helicopters
Homebuilt aircraft
Aircraft first flown in 1997